Steven Weisberg is a film editor who is known for his collaborations with directors Alfonso Cuarón and Barry Sonnenfeld.

Filmography
 Hope Springs (2012)
 Sir Billi (2012)
 Albert Nobbs (2011)
 Morning Glory (2010)
 Mother and Child (2010)
 Mr. Magorium's Wonder Emporium (2007)
 Man of the Year (2006)
 Asylum (2005)
 The Producers (2005)
 Harry Potter and the Prisoner of Azkaban (2004)
 I Am David (2004)
 Big Trouble (2002)
 Men in Black II (2002)
 Nurse Betty (2000)
 Message in a Bottle (1999)
 Great Expectations (1998)
 Permanent Midnight (1998)
 The Cable Guy (1996)
 Miami Rhapsody (1995)
 A Little Princess (1995)
 Mistress (1992)
 The Color of Evening (1991)
 Gaby-A True Story (1987)

References

Living people
Place of birth missing (living people)
British film editors
1960 births